The Joint Service Mountain Training Centre (JSMTC) is the British military training centre for its armed forces that delivers adventurous training (AT).

History
Adventurous training across all three British armed forces was made tri-service in 1999. The site opened in April 1999. An indoor climbing centre was added in July 2000.

Function
It supplies parts of the Armed Forces Adventurous Training Scheme (AFATS) for Joint Service Adventurous Training (JSAT). Since 2014, adventurous training instructors have been trained at the site (Joint Service Adventurous Training Instructors, or JSATI).

Structure
The site is situated around a half-mile west of the Britannia Bridge, off the A4080. Llanfairpwll railway station is nearby, to the west. A 400 kV transmission line crosses east–west, close by to the north. The Army Mountaineering Association is headquartered at the site.

Adventurous Training is the responsibility of the Adventurous Training Group (ATG).

Other sites
 Army Adventure Training Bavaria (JSMTC Bavaria), has skiing at its Alpine Training Centre (ATC) in Oberstdorf in the Allgäu Alps
 JSMTC Ballachulish
 JSMTC Scotland

See also
 List of mountain warfare forces
 Mountain Training Association (MTA)

References

External links
 Army Adventurous Training

1999 establishments in Wales
Canoe organizations
Canoeing in the United Kingdom
Climbing organizations
Educational organisations based in Wales
Indoor climbing
Llanfairpwllgwyngyll
Military installations established in 1999
Military installations in Wales
Military training establishments of the United Kingdom
Military units and formations established in 1999
Mountain warfare training installations
Mountaineering in Wales
Paragliding
Physical education in the United Kingdom
Sailing in Wales
Skiing in the United Kingdom
Skiing organizations
Outdoor recreation in Wales